Mad Mex Fresh Mexican Grill, referred to simply as Mad Mex,  is an Australian-based multinational chain of fast-food restaurants based in Sydney, New South Wales, that purveys Mexican cuisine, while the Mad Group own the master franchise for the restaurant in New Zealand.

Mad Mex Fresh Mexican is Lucha libre-themed and was voted the best Mexican restaurant nationwide in the Lifestyle Food Awards.

, 71 locations are in operation.

History
4Fingers Crispy Chicken announced its acquisition of 50% stake in Australia-based Mad Mex Fresh Mexican Grill (Mad Mex) on 19 September 2019. Mad Mex is an Australian Mexican QSR brand with a strong presence in New Zealand as well.

As part of the partnership, 4FINGERS will initially establish Mad Mex's presence in Southeast Asia and expects to open a number of outlets in Singapore and Malaysia by the end of 2019.

In 2019, Mad Mex opened stores internationally in Singapore and Malaysia.

In 2021, Mad Mex announced that they were once again 100 per cent Australian owned after the company bought out its 50 per cent Singaporean joint venture partner.

Founder 
Clovis Young, the co-founder of Mad Mex, grew up in California and Massachusetts before becoming a graduate of Carnegie Mellon University in Pittsburgh, which has an entirely separate chain of restaurants that are also titled Mad Mex.

See also

List of restaurants in Australia
List of Mexican restaurants

References

External links

Fast-food chains of Australia
Fast-food Mexican restaurants
Restaurants established in 2007
2007 establishments in Australia
Theme restaurants
Food and drink companies based in Sydney
Mexican restaurants in Australia